Municipal Chambers can refer to:
 City and town halls
 Câmara Municipal, executive body of a municipality in Portugal and former colonies